The 2017 UEFA Women's Under-19 Championship (also known as UEFA Women's Under-19 Euro 2017) was the 16th edition of the UEFA Women's Under-19 Championship (20th edition if the Under-18 era is included), the annual international youth football championship organised by UEFA for the women's under-19 national teams of Europe. Northern Ireland was selected by UEFA on 26 January 2015 as the host country for the tournament.

A total of eight teams played in the tournament, with players born on or after 1 January 1998 eligible to participate.

Same as previous editions held in odd-numbered years, the tournament acts as the UEFA qualifiers for the FIFA U-20 Women's World Cup. The top four teams of the tournament qualified for the 2018 FIFA U-20 Women's World Cup in France as the UEFA representatives, besides France who qualified automatically as hosts.

Qualification

A total of 48 UEFA nations entered the competition, and with the hosts Northern Ireland qualifying automatically, the other 47 teams competed in the qualifying competition to determine the remaining seven spots in the final tournament. The qualifying competition consisted of two rounds: Qualifying round, which took place in autumn 2016, and Elite round, which took place in spring 2017.

Qualified teams
The following eight teams qualified for the final tournament.

Note: All appearance statistics include only U-19 era (since 2002).

Notes

Final draw
The final draw was held on 22 June 2017, 15:00 BST (UTC+1), at the Belfast City Hall in Belfast, Northern Ireland. The eight teams were drawn into two groups of four teams. There was no seeding, except that hosts Northern Ireland were assigned to position A1 in the draw.

Venues
The tournament was hosted in four venues:

Squads
Each national team have to submit a squad of 18 players.

Match officials
A total of 6 referees, 8 assistant referees and 2 fourth officials were appointed for the final tournament.

Referees
 Barbara Poxhofer (Austria)
 Volha Tsiareshka (Belarus)
 Justina Lavrenovaitė (Lithuania)
 Marte Sørø (Norway)
 Silvia Domingos (Portugal)
 Petra Pavlikova (Slovakia)

Assistant referees
 Bérengère Pierart (Belgium)
 Gabriela Hanáková (Czech Republic)
 Nina Hammarberg (Finland)
 Elena Soklevska-Ilievski (Macedonia)
 Iuliia Petrova (Russia)
 Vikki Robertson (Scotland)
 Ivana Lesková (Slovakia)
 Staša Špur (Slovenia)

Fourth officials
 Rebecca Welch (England)
 Cheryl Foster (Wales)

Group stage
The final tournament schedule was confirmed on 22 June 2017.

The group winners and runners-up advance to the semi-finals and qualify for the 2018 FIFA U-20 Women's World Cup.

Tiebreakers
The teams are ranked according to points (3 points for a win, 1 point for a draw, 0 points for a loss). If two or more teams are equal on points on completion of the group matches, the following tie-breaking criteria are applied, in the order given, to determine the rankings (Regulations Articles 17.01 and 17.02):
Higher number of points obtained in the group matches played among the teams in question;
Superior goal difference resulting from the group matches played among the teams in question;
Higher number of goals scored in the group matches played among the teams in question;
If, after having applied criteria 1 to 3, teams still have an equal ranking, criteria 1 to 3 are reapplied exclusively to the group matches between the teams in question to determine their final rankings. If this procedure does not lead to a decision, criteria 5 to 9 apply;
Superior goal difference in all group matches;
Higher number of goals scored in all group matches;
If only two teams have the same number of points, and they are tied according to criteria 1 to 6 after having met in the last round of the group stage, their rankings are determined by a penalty shoot-out (not used if more than two teams have the same number of points, or if their rankings are not relevant for qualification for the next stage).
Lower disciplinary points total based only on yellow and red cards received in the group matches (red card = 3 points, yellow card = 1 point, expulsion for two yellow cards in one match = 3 points);
Higher position in the coefficient ranking list used for the qualifying round draw;
Drawing of lots.

All times are local, BST (UTC+1).

Group A

Group B

Knockout stage
In the knockout stage, extra time and penalty shoot-out are used to decide the winner if necessary.

On 2 May 2016, the UEFA Executive Committee agreed that the competition would be part of the International Football Association Board (IFAB)'s trial to allow a fourth substitute to be made during extra time. On 1 June 2017, it was also announced as part of a trial sanctioned by the IFAB to reduce the advantage of the team shooting first in a penalty shoot-out, a different sequence of taking penalties, known as "ABBA", that mirrors the serving sequence in a tennis tiebreak would be used if a penalty shoot-out was needed (team A kicks first, team B kicks second):
Original sequence
AB AB AB AB AB (sudden death starts) AB AB etc.
Trial sequence
AB BA AB BA AB (sudden death starts) BA AB etc.

Bracket

FIFA U-20 Women's World Cup play-off
Winner qualifies for 2018 FIFA U-20 Women's World Cup.

Semi-finals

Final

Goalscorers
Note: Goals scored in the FIFA U-20 Women's World Cup play-off are included in this list, but are not counted by UEFA for statistical purposes.

5 goals

 Patricia Guijarro

3 goals

 Mathilde Bourdieu
 Emelyne Laurent
 Klara Bühl
 Annamaria Serturini

2 goals

 Georgia Allen
 Annalena Rieke
 Aniek Nouwen
 Victoria Pelova
 Joëlle Smits
 Lucía García

1 goal

 Zoe Cross (in play-off)
 Mollie Rouse (in play-off)
 Lina Boussaha
 Christy Gavory
 Catherine Karadjov
 Agathe Ollivier
 Julie Thibaud
 Anna Gerhardt
 Luca Maria Graf
 Giulia Gwinn
 Kristin Kögel
 Ereleta Memeti
 Dina Orschmann
 Caroline Siems
 Alice Regazzoli
 Fenna Kalma
 Ashleigh Weerden
 Louise McDaniel
 Kirsty Hanson
 Damaris Egurrola
 Maite Oroz

1 own goal

 Julie Piga (against Netherlands)
 Aniek Nouwen (against Italy)

Team of the Tournament

Goalkeepers
 Sandy MacIver
 Mylène Chavas
 Lize Kop

Defenders
 Dina Orschmann
 Caroline Siems
 Ona Batlle
 Carmen Menayo
 Lucía Rodríguez

Midfielders
 Sana Daoudi
 Janina Minge
 Victoria Pelova
 Damaris Egurrola
 Patricia Guijarro
 Maite Oroz

Forwards
 Mathilde Bourdieu
 Emelyne Laurent
 Klara Bühl
 Laura Freigang

Qualified teams for FIFA U-20 Women's World Cup
The following five teams from UEFA qualified for the 2018 FIFA U-20 Women's World Cup, including France which qualified as hosts.

1 Bold indicates champions for that year. Italic indicates hosts for that year.

References

External links

2017 WU19 EURO final tournament: Northern Ireland, UEFA.com

 
2017
Women's Under-19 Championship
2017 Uefa Women's Under-19 Championship
2017 in women's association football
2016–17 in Northern Ireland association football
August 2017 sports events in Europe
2017 in youth association football